The following poll makes up the 1959 NCAA University Division baseball rankings.  Collegiate Baseball Newspaper published its first human poll of the top 20 teams in college baseball in 1957, however 1959 is the first season for which records are available.

Collegiate Baseball

Currently, only the final poll from the 1959 season is available.

Notes

References

 
College baseball rankings in the United States